Surgery is the third full-length album by American psychedelic rock band the Warlocks. It was released by major label Mute in 2005, and was produced by Tom Rothrock.

The album also marks the first time the US and UK releases have featured identical track listings.

Content 

Surgery has been remarked on by critics for having a more refined sound to 2002's Phoenix, a sound described by band leader Bobby Hecksher as "space age doo-wop". The average track length is notably shorter to previous releases, and the album is lyrically darker to the drug-centric Phoenix and Rise and Fall.

According to the liner notes, the album is dedicated to the memory of fellow Los Angeles-based musician Elliott Smith and to Bomp! Records founder Greg Shaw.

Reception 

Surgery has been generally well-received by critics. Drowned in Sound wrote: "'Surgery' isn't the unlistenable, depression-fest it's  lyrical content threatens it to be. Instead, it's heartfelt message combined with the monstrous sound behind it make it one of the most curiously uplifting records of the year."

Track listing

"Come Save Us" – 4:43
"It's Just Like Surgery" – 4:06
"Gypsy Nightmare" – 4:20
"Angels in Heaven, Angels in Hell" – 4:15
"We Need Starpower" – 4:26
"Thursday's Radiation" – 7:44
"Evil Eyes Again" – 3:32
"The Tangent" – 5:01
"Above Earth" – 4:20
"Bleed Without You Babe" – 4:24
"Suicide Note" – 12:12

References

External links 

 

2005 albums
The Warlocks albums
Albums produced by Tom Rothrock
Mute Records albums